The 1992 Lufthansa Cup was a women's tennis tournament played on outdoor clay courts at the Rot-Weiss Tennis Club in Berlin, Germany that was part of the Tier I category of the 1992 WTA Tour. It was the 23rd edition of the tournament and was held from 11 May until 17 May 1992. First-seeded Steffi Graf won the singles title, her sixth at the event, and earned $110,000 first-prize money.

Finals

Singles
 Steffi Graf defeated  Arantxa Sánchez Vicario 4–6, 7–5, 6–2
 It was Graf's 3rd singles title of the year and the 64th of her career.

Doubles
 Jana Novotná /  Larisa Neiland defeated  Gigi Fernández /  Natalia Zvereva 7–6(7–5), 4–6, 7–5

Prize money

References

External links
 ITF tournament edition details
 Tournament draws

Lufthansa Cup
WTA German Open
1992 in German tennis